Pepemkay is an extinct genus of lissoberycine trachichthyid fish in prehistoric North America.

The prehistoric ray-finned fish genus contains a single species, Pepemkay maya.

Fossil record
Pepemkay maya is known from fossils in the Sierra Madre Formation, from the Cenomanian stage during the Late Cretaceous epoch.

The geologic formation is located in Chiapas state of southwestern Mexico.

See also

References

Prehistoric ray-finned fish genera
Cretaceous Mexico
Fossils of Mexico
Late Cretaceous fish of North America
Natural history of Chiapas
Trachichthyidae
Cenomanian life
Fossil taxa described in 2013